Chikuma may refer to:
 Chikuma mountains, mountains in Nagano Prefecture of Japan
 Chikuma, Nagano, a city located in Nagano Prefecture of Japan
 Chikuma Station
 Chikuma District, a former district located in the vicinity of the current city of Matsumoto
 Chikuma River, the name of the Shinano River as it flows through Nagano Prefecture
 Chikuma, Angola, a commune
 Chikuma-class cruiser, a class of protected cruisers of the Imperial Japanese Navy 
 Japanese ship Chikuma, several warships
 Chikuma Shobō, a Japanese publisher
 Chikuma Koshirou, a character in the novel The Kouga Ninja Scrolls